Harry Asher Badt (September 22, 1884 – September 7, 1967) was an American naval officer who served in both World War I and World War II.

Military career 
Harry Badt attended the U.S. Naval Academy and graduated in 1908. Some time after he was commissioned into the Navy, he served aboard the USS Annapolis in the Caribbean and off the coast of Mexico in 1912. He first saw action during the occupation of Nicaragua in 1912 and later during the occupation of Veracruz in 1914, still aboard the Annapolis.

First World War 
After receiving his M.S. from Columbia University in 1916, Badt served aboard the USS Minneapolis and the USS Arizona during the First World War. Aboard the Minneapolis, Badt participated in convoy escort operations along the Atlantic coast and out into the open ocean to turn over the convoys to British destroyers. After being transferred to the USS Arizona in 1918, Badt and the rest of the crew trained heavily in Chesapeake until the ship departed for British waters on 18 November 1918.

Inter-War period 
From 1923 to 1924, Badt commanded the USS Simpson in European waters before returning to the U.S. to begin serving aboard the USS Marblehead in until 1926. In 1926, Badt was served as an instructor at the Naval Academy, where he would teach until 1928 to take command of the USS Nokomis. Badt commanded the Nokomis until 1930, conducting oceanographic surveys of Mexican and Caribbean waters under the direction of the Hydrographic Office. He returned to his previous role as an instructor at Annapolis until 1933, when he was appointed Commanding Officer of the 1933 Aleutian Islands survey expedition. Shortly after returning from the Aleutian Islands expedition, Badt was placed in command of U.S. Navy recruiting operations from 1935-1937. After teaching at the Naval Academy, Badt went on to study at the Naval War College, from which he graduated in 1938.

Second World War 
Under his command, the Tuscaloosa participated in Fleet problem XX and a goodwill tour along the coast of South America along with USS San Francisco and USS Quincy. Upon the outbreak of the Second World War in Europe in September 1939, the Tuscaloosa was assigned to the Neutrality Patrol for the rest of the year. Captain Badt was transferred prior to the Tuscaloosa'''s rescue of the German liner Columbus's crew in late December 1940.Dictionary of American Naval Fighting Ships: Volume VII, (Washington, D.C.: United States Government Printing Office, 1959), PP. 356-357  After just under two years in command of the USS Tuscaloosa, and with the U.S. entry into the Second World War looming, Badt was transferred to the Bureau of Naval Personnel as the director of Enlisted Personnel until 1942, when he was appointed director of Special Projects, position he would hold until after the war's end. During this time, Badt was promoted to the rank of Commodore and is credited with the construction of three Naval Training Stations in Sampson, New York, Bainbridge, Maryland, and Farragut, Idaho. He retired in 1947.

Awards 
Badt received the Legion of Merit for actions during World War II.

 Death 
Harry Badt died on 7 September 1967. He is buried with his wife, Jennie Badt, at the Arlington National Cemetery.

 References 

 Bibliography 
Ancell, Manning R; Miller, Christine M. The Biographical Dictionary of World War II Generals and Flag Officers, (Westport, CT: Greenwood Press, 1996), pp. 492-493 
"BADT, Harry Asher", Harry Asher Badt, Arlington National Cemetery, Accessed 17 June 2019. https://ancexplorer.army.mil/publicwmv/#/arlington-national/search/results/1/CgRCYWR0EgVIYXJyeRoFQXNoZXI-/ Dictionary of American Naval Fighting Ships: Volume I, (Washington, D.C.: United States Government Printing Office, 1959), PP. 47, 61 Dictionary of American Naval Fighting Ships: Volume IV, (Washington, D.C.: United States Government Printing Office, 1959), PP. 370-371Dictionary of American Naval Fighting Ships: Volume V, (Washington, D.C.: United States Government Printing Office, 1959), PP. 102 Dictionary of American Naval Fighting Ships: Volume VII'', (Washington, D.C.: United States Government Printing Office, 1959), PP. 356-357 
Together We Served. "Badt, Harry, RDML" Commodore Harry Asher Badt. Accessed 18 June 2019. Shadow box
Toppan, Andrew. "USS TUSCALOOSA (CA 37)" Accessed 18 June 2019. Cruiser Photo Index CA-37 USS TUSCALOOSA - Navsource - Photographic History of the U.S. Navy

1884 births
1967 deaths
Military personnel from Texas
United States Naval Academy alumni
United States Navy World War II admirals
United States Navy admirals
People from Tyler, Texas
Recipients of the Legion of Merit
United States Navy personnel of World War I
Burials at Arlington National Cemetery
Columbia University alumni